The Bay of Bengal Gateway (BBG) is a submarine communications cable providing a direct trunk connection between Barka (Sultanate of Oman) and Penang (Malaysia) with four branches to Fujairah (UAE), Mumbai (India), Colombo (Sri Lanka) and Chennai (India). The project was carried out by a consortium that includes Vodafone, Omantel, Etisalat, AT&T, China Telecom, Telstra, Reliance Jio Infocomm, Dialog and Telekom Malaysia. Construction was started in May 2013 and was completed by the end of 2014. From Penang the system is connected via a terrestrial connection to Singapore.

The BBG Cable system creates a high-speed bridge between Europe, Middle East, Central Asia, and the Far East, with Singapore being a major cable hub with connection into the Far East and Barka in Oman with submarine and terrestrial connections to Europe, Africa and the GCC.

Landing points
It has the following landing points:
 Barka (Sultanate of Oman)
Penang (Malaysia)
Fujairah (UAE)
Mumbai (India)
Mount Lavinia (Sri Lanka)
Chennai (India)

From Penang the system is connected via a terrestrial connection to Singapore.

Countries linked
Sultanate of Oman
United Arab Emirates
India
Sri Lanka
Malaysia
Singapore

100G technology
The BBG Submarine Communications Cable build by Alcatel-Lucent Submarine Networks is a three-fibre-pair cable, with submerged repeaters, submarine branching units and reconfigurable optical add-drop multiplexers and is based on 100G dense wavelength division multiplexing Coherent Technology, utilising wavelength add/drop branching units along the route with an overall design capacity of 10 Tbit/s per fibre pair, underpinning the continued bandwidth growth of new broadband applications and services in the Middle East, The Indian sub-continent and the Far East.

The Coherent Technology used on the system mainly consist of four major elements: high order amplitude/phase modulation, polarization multiplexing, coherent detection using a local oscillator laser in the receiver, and high-speed analog-to-digital converters and sophisticated digital signal processing in the receiver, 100G Coherent Technology can overcome various fibre impairments, such as chromatic dispersion (CD) and polarization mode dispersion (PMD).

See also

 List of international submarine communications cables
 Other submarine cables used to cross-connect with BBG
 EIG
 EPEG
 FALCON

References

 
 
 
 
 
 
 

Submarine communications cables in the Arabian Sea
Submarine communications cables in the Indian Ocean
Submarine communications cables in the Pacific Ocean
Telecommunications in India
Bay of Bengal
Jio
Year of establishment missing
2014 establishments in Asia
2014 establishments in Maharashtra
2014 establishments in Tamil Nadu